Langone is a surname. Notable people with the surname include:

 Clementina Langone, Italian-American community activist
 Frederick C. Langone, American politician
 Kenneth Langone, American venture capitalist
 Joseph A. Langone, Jr., American politician
 Michael Langone, American counseling psychologist
 Stefano Langone, American singer

See also
 NYU Langone Medical Center